Process Systems Design and Control Laboratory (PSDC) was founded at the Yeungnam University, Gyeongsan, South Korea, in 1994 to carry out the extensive research associated with the process design and process control area.  Professor Moonyong Lee, Ph.D. is the adviser of this laboratory. Currently it employs 19 members including Postdoctoral, Ph.D., Masters and Undergraduate students. More than 45 distinguished alumni are now working in very famous organizations like Honeywell, Samsung, AID and LG Corporation.

Goals and Missions

The mission of PSDC laboratory is to conduct research and education in the field of process systems engineering and to develop industry partnerships to solve significant issues of interest in process systems.

The technological and economical developments of a last few decades have brought a revolutionary change in the way chemical processes and production facilities are designed and operated. Conventional process systems are now discarded whereas modern and next generation plants; however, tend to adopt state of the art clean technologies for environmental safety and to be highly integrated (utilizing recycle streams, energy recovery networks, etc.) to provide a more efficient utilization of natural resources. But this integration could make the process more difficult to run and control the plant. Subsequently, much interest in advanced control systems with modern control techniques has emerged and PSDC has carried out the widespread research regarding on the Process Design and Control field since 1994. Many of the research activities are focused on the industrial projects because of the unique feature of the laboratory. This allows the graduate students to get various industrial experiences with the capability for the able process engineer.

See also

Yeungnam University
List of Korea-related topics
Education in South Korea
List of people in systems and control
CO2 Emission Calculator

Notes and references

 Process Systems Design and Control Laboratory Homepage
 Divided Wall Column Developed by PSDC with LG CRD team
 BK21 Scholarship Program

External links
Yeungnam University Official website
School of Chemical Engineering & Technology, Yeungnam University
AIChE The American Institute of Chemical Engineers
KIChE-Korean Institute of Chemical Engineers
The Korean Society of Industrial and Engineering
International Federation of Automatic Control

Universities and colleges in North Gyeongsang Province
Universities and colleges in Daegu